The following is a list of football stadiums in Denmark, ordered by capacity. The minimum required capacity is 3,000.

Existing stadiums

Planned future stadiums and expansions
New Helsingør Stadium
Sydbank Park expansion

See also
List of stadiums in the Nordic countries by capacity
List of association football stadiums by capacity
List of European stadiums by capacity

 
Denmark
Football stadiums